Muhamad Nur Izzat bin Che Awang (born 2 January 1998) is a Malaysian footballer who plays as a forward for Malaysia Super League club Penang.

References

External links
 

1998 births
Living people
Sri Pahang FC players
Penang F.C. players
Malaysian footballers
Malaysian people of Malay descent
People from Pahang
Malaysia Super League players
Association football forwards